The second season of Latin American Idol premiered on June 13, 2007, and continued until September 27, 2007, when it was won by Guatemalan born Carlos Peña. Auditions were held in Caracas, Bogotá, Mexico City, and Buenos Aires in the spring of 2007.  The concerts began on July in Buenos Aires, Argentina, the host country. For this season the judge Elizabeth Meza quit, and the Mexican singer Mimi was hired as the new Latin American Idol judge. At age 19, Peña is the first male and youngest person to win the competition, and second winner to never have been in the bottom two or three.

Top 12 Finalists

Performers on results shows
Week 1 (August 2) - Belinda performed "Luz Sin Gravedad".
Week 2 (August 9) - Emmanuel performed "Sentirme Vivo".
Week 3 (August 16) - Diego Torres performed "Abriendo Caminos" and "Hasta Cuando".
Week 4 (August 23) - Ricardo Montaner performed "Echame a mi la culpa"
Week 5 (August 30) - Mijares performed "Para Amarnos Más"
Week 6 (September 6) - No Performer
Week 7 (September 13) - Hernán López Sosa performed "Deuda" and "Flaca".
Week 8 (September 20) - Gloria Trevi performed "Todos Me Miran".
Week 9 (September 27) - Paulina Rubio performed "Ni Una Sola Palabra" and "Nada Puede Cambiarme", Efraín Medina performed "Trataré de Olvidarte", Miranda! performed "Perfecta" and "Prisionero", and Juanes performed "Es Por Ti" and "Me Enamora".

Elimination chart

Semi-finals (Top 30)

First Workshop
Held on July 4, 2007. The semi-finalists eliminated from the competition were:

Second Workshop
Held on July 11, 2007. The semi-finalists eliminated from the competition were:

Third Workshop
Held on July 18, 2007. The semi-finalists eliminated from the competition were:

Wild Card Workshop
For this workshop, there were originally six people out of the three semi-final groups that would have a second chance to become the tenth and last finalist. On the Third Workshop results, it was announced that three more semifinalists would join the Wild Card Workshop. It was held on July 25, 2007. On the same night, it was announced that there were going to be three finalists chosen from this group, instead of just one like the previous season, creating now a Top 12. The semi-finalists eliminated from the competition were:

Top 100
Argentina

• Esteban Peleteiro

• Silvana Condoruci

• Solmi Rodríguez

• Micaela Salinas

• María de los Angeles Monasterio

• Leonel Copiz

• Celeste Ruiz

• María Delfina Peña

• Esteban Maestre

• Virginia Modica

• Mercedes Pieretti

• Manuel Salas

• Paula Reus

Chile

• Licetty Alfaro

• Aylyn Vicencio

• Marco Antonio Pino (Top 30 from Season 1)

Colombia

• Lina María Paredes

• Viviana Saa

• Jonathan Reyes

• Ángelo Paredes

• Diego Gamboa

• Ángela María Forero

• Carolina Muñoz

• Juliana Muñoz

• Sandra Milena Serrato

Costa Rica

• Zaida Dobles

• Angie Valverde

Ecuador

• Jessie Almeida

El Salvador

• Carlos Ernesto Alfaro

Mexico

• Thalía Vargas

• Guillermo Nieto

• Sergio Arzate

• Daniela Gallardo

• Érica Grovas

• Natalia Leal

• Héctor Trejo

• Gerardo Cerrillo

• Héctor Silva del Castillo

Panama

• Amanda Herrera

• Karen Peralta

Puerto Rico

• Jorge Monserrat (Top 30 from Season 1)

• Alejandro Irizarry

• Esteban Núñez

Uruguay

• Martín Ramírez

• Juan Cerviño

• Stefanie Álvarez

• Pablo Ferraz

Venezuela

• Adabella Núñez

• Alberto Silva

• Stephanie Argüello

• Andrea Galindo

• Reynaldo Mercier

• Rosalba Bueno (Top 30 from Season 1)

• Nerymar Sanó (Winner of Venezuela's reality show "Fama y Aplausos")

• Víctor Síndar

• Giovanna Pisani

• Simón López Chacín

• Andrea Silva

• Homero Briceño

• Raynier Álvarez

• Sanyer Nelo

External links
 Official website

Latin American Idol
2007 television seasons
2007 in Latin music